Geologically, a low island is an island of coral origin. The term applies whether the island was formed as a result of sedimentation upon a coral reef or of the uplifting of such islands. The term is used to distinguish such islands from high islands, whose origins are volcanic.

Definition and location
The high versus low designation is related to the geologic origin of the island rather than its physical elevation. This distinction is important to understand, as there are some low islands, such as Banaba, Makatea, Nauru, and Niue, which rise several hundred feet above sea level, while numerous high islands (those of volcanic origin) rise a few feet above sea level, often classified as "rocks". Low islands are the kind of islands which ring the lagoons of atolls.

The two types of islands are often found in proximity to each other. This is especially the case among the islands of the South Pacific Ocean, where low islands are found on the fringing reefs that surround most high islands.

Climate and habitability
Low islands have poor, sandy soil and little fresh water, which makes them difficult to farm. They cannot support human habitation as well as high islands. They are also threatened by sea level rise due to global warming. The people that do live on low islands survive mostly by fishing. Low islands usually have an oceanic climate.

References

External links
Micronesian culture: High island and low island cultures at Britannica.com. Retrieved 2011-09-22.

Islands by type